MFZ is the Mocha Fracture Zone, a transform fault on the Nazca Plate.

MFZ may also refer to:

 Mabaan language, spoken in Sudan (by ISO 639 code)
 Mofaz Air, a Malaysian airline (by ICAO code)
 Mesalia Airport, Papua New Guinea (by IATA code)